Liene Priede is a Latvian basketball player. She plays for CC Lady Pirates and Latvia women's national basketball team. She has represented national team in EuroBasket Women 2011.

References

External links 
 FIBA Europe profile
 CC Lady Pirates profile

Living people
Latvian women's basketball players
Basketball players from Riga
1990 births
Shooting guards